Harimabad (also Romanized as Ḩarīmābād) is a village in Zeberkhan Rural District, Zeberkhan District, Nishapur County, Razavi Khorasan Province, Iran. At the 2006 census, its population was 284, in 82 families.

References 

Populated places in Nishapur County